James Carroll's Constantine's Sword, or Constantine's Sword, is a 2007 historical documentary film on the relationship between the Catholic Church and Jews. Directed and produced by Oscar-nominated filmmaker Oren Jacoby, the film is inspired by former priest James P. Carroll's 2001 book Constantine's Sword.

Synopsis
The title page of this film shows the shadow of a cross, with "No war is holy" written across the transept. Constantine’s Sword is the story of James P. Carroll's journey to uncover the roots of war. Carroll, a former Catholic priest whose father (Joseph Carroll) was a famous Air Force general, implies that there has been a relationship between religiously inspired violence and war, beginning with the adoption of Christianity by the Roman Emperor Constantine I in 312 AD. Constantine was convinced that he had won a battle because he had followed the instructions of a vision, to inscribe a sign of the cross (the Labarum) on the shields of his soldiers. In Carroll's view, this event marked the beginning of an unholy alliance between the military and the Church.

Carroll focuses on Catholic and evangelical anti-Judaism, and invokes the cross as a symbol of the long history of Christian xenophobic violence against Jews and non-Christians, from the Crusades, through the Roman Inquisition and the creation of the Jewish ghetto, to the Holocaust. Carroll also charges that there is an ongoing evangelical infiltration of the U.S. military, and that this has had negative consequences for U.S. foreign policy. The film's final chapter, "No war is holy", concludes with views of military cemeteries as Aaron Neville sings "With God On Our Side".

Technical details
95 minutes
Languages in film: English, German, Italian and Yiddish
Cast/Featuring: Liev Schreiber, pastor Ted Haggard, Philip Bosco, Natasha Richardson, Eli Wallach
Director: Oren Jacoby 
Producers: Oren Jacoby, James Carroll, Michael Solomon, Betsy West.
Supervising producer: Elgin Smith
Screenwriters: James Carroll, Oren Jacoby 
Production company: Storyville Films
Studio: First Run Features

See also
Constantine's Sword (2001) book by James P. Carroll

References

External links

Film's website
Recommendation by Tikkun magazine
At Rotten Tomatoes
Link to production company
James Carroll's Unholy Crusade: A Critique of the Film Constantine's Sword from First Things
 Voices on Antisemitism Interview with James Carroll from the United States Holocaust Memorial Museum

2007 documentary films
2000s political films
2000s war films
Films about antisemitism
2007 films
Anti-war films
American documentary films
Christian anti-Judaism
Films directed by Oren Jacoby
First Run Features films
2000s English-language films
2000s American films
Constantine the Great and Christianity
English-language documentary films